Genai (also Romanized as Genā‘ī and Ganā‘ī; also known as Ganā) is a village in Dezhgan Rural District, in the Central District of Bandar Lengeh County, Hormozgan Province, Iran. At the 2006 census, its population was 554, in 131 families.

References 

Populated places in Bandar Lengeh County